General elections were held in Antigua and Barbuda on 18 January 2023 to elect members of the House of Representatives. The Labour Party (ABLP) has held an absolute majority of 15 seats in the House of Representatives after the 2018 general election, with Gaston Browne remaining as prime minister. Browne initiated a constitutional referendum after the 2018 election, which was rejected by voters, and following the death of Elizabeth II in 2022, he announced his intention to organise a referendum for the transition of Antigua and Barbuda to a republican system. Besides ABLP, the United Progressive Party (UPP), Democratic National Alliance, Barbuda People's Movement (BPM), and three independent politicians filed candidacies for the 2023 general election.

During the election campaign, UPP proposed to raise the minimum wage and expressed support for small businesses, while ABLP pledged to construct more homes and open two polyclinics. ABLP retained its majority in the House of Representatives, although it won a reduced 9 seats, while UPP won 6 seats. Trevor Walker, the leader of the BPM, retained his seat in Barbuda, while Asot Michael, an independent politician and former member of ABLP, won his seat in the St. Peter constituency. Browne was sworn in for his third consecutive term as prime minister a day after the election.

Background 
The previous general election was held 15 months early before the scheduled date due to the outgoing prime minister, Gaston Browne, wanting to obtain enough support for the implementation of several projects, such as land reform, in 2019. Browne retained his office, while his Labour Party (ABLP) increased its absolute majority in the House of Representatives. The United Progressive Party (UPP) suffered defeat, with its leader, Harold Lovell, losing his seat.

Since then, Browne attempted to modify the constitution to make the Caribbean Court of Justice the final court of appeal in the country in place of the Judicial Committee of the Privy Council. This was however rejected in a referendum in November 2018. Following the death of Elizabeth II in September 2022, Browne announced his intention to organise a referendum within three years regarding the transition to a republican system.

Electoral system 
The 17 elected members of the House of Representatives were elected in single-member constituencies by first-past-the-post voting; 16 of the seats were allocated for the island of Antigua and one for the island of Barbuda. In December 2022, Browne announced that the election would be held on 18 January 2023.

Political parties 

The table below lists political parties represented in the House of Representatives after the 2018 general election.

Pre-election composition

Campaign 

UPP presented its election manifesto on 9 January 2023. Lovell proposed a EC$10 per hour minimum wage and a 10% wage and salary increase for public servants, as well as support for a stable water supply and small businesses. ABLP announced its manifesto on 10 January, proposing to construct more than 1,000 new homes, rebuild the sea landing in Barbuda and open two polyclinics. Both parties also expressed support "for a greener Barbuda". Lovell also declined to debate with Browne. The ABLP branch office for the St. John's City East constituency was set on fire on 16 January.

Carty Anderson, an independent politician formerly associated with UPP, filed his candidacy due to "continued neglect" of the citizens of the St. John's Rural West constituency. Another independent, Gail Pero-Weston, campaigned on "creating a better political landscape rather than representing a single constituency".

Candidates 
On 25 March 2022, the ABLP announced their official candidates. New candidates from the Labour Party include Rawdon Turner replacing Asot Michael, Barbuda senator Knacyntar Nedd replacing Arthur Nibbs and senator Gail Christian replacing deputy speaker of the House Londell Benjamin. The UPP nominated candidates in all constituencies except Barbuda.

The Democratic National Alliance (DNA) announced its candidates in April 2022. DNA later announced that Avoy Knight and Tecla Thomas traded their constituencies, and that Stephen Richardson would be their candidate for the St. John's Rural West constituency. Additionally, Moraine Knight was nominated for the St. John's City West constituency and Mario Thomas was nominated for the St. Phillip North constituency. The Barbuda People's Movement (BPM), led by its representative Trevor Walker, announced that it would run in the Barbuda constituency. Independent politicians Carty Anderson, Gail Pero-Weston, and Michael Asot filed to run in St. John's Rural West, St. John's Rural South, and St. Peter constituencies respectively.

Results 
Voting stations were opened from 06:00 to 18:00, and there were 60,916 citizens in total that had the right to vote in the general election. On 5 January 2023, it was announced that the Commonwealth Observer Group, headed by the former president of Seychelles, Danny Faure, would observe the election. CARICOM, as well as the Organization of American States, also announced that it would observe over the election. The Caribbean Development Research Services reported lower turnout in comparison with the previous general election.

The Electoral Commission reported that ABLP won 9 seats in the election, while the UPP won 6 seats in total. In Barbuda, BPM retained its seat while DNA did not win any, although Asot Michael, an independent politician, won his seat in the St. Peter constituency. Lovell of UPP also failed to win his seat.

By constituency

Aftermath 
Local news outlets reported that ABLP won 9 seats and that it retained its majority in the House of Representatives. Browne addressed his supporters shortly after the election and was congratulated by Bruno Rodríguez Parrilla, the minister of foreign affairs of Cuba. Joanne Massiah, the leader of the DNA, conceded the election, while Lovell resigned as the leader of UPP. Browne was inaugurated into his third consecutive term in office on 19 January 2023.

References 

Antigua
2023 in Antigua and Barbuda
Elections in Antigua and Barbuda
January 2023 events in North America